Ray Bryant Trio is an album by pianist Ray Bryant recorded in 1956 for the Epic label.

Track listing 
All compositions by Ray Bryant, except where indicated.
 "Cubano Chant" – 3:06
 "Off Shore" (Leo Diamond, Steve Graham) – 3:56
 "Well, You Needn't" (Thelonious Monk) – 3:19
 "Cry Me a River" (Arthur Hamilton) – 3:51
 "In a Mellow Tone" (Duke Ellington) – 4:22
 "You're My Thrill" (Burton Lane, Ned Washington) – 4:23
 "Night in Tunisia" (Dizzy Gillespie, Felix Paparelli) – 2:41
 "Goodbye" (Gordon Jenkins) – 3:58
 "Philadelphia Bound" – 2:35
 "Pawn Ticket" – 2:49
 "The Breeze and I" (Ernesto Lecuona, Al Stillman) – 3:28
 "It's a Pity to Say Goodnight" (Billy Reid) – 2:24
Recorded in NYC on April 3, 1956  (tracks 2, 4, 8 & 9), May 3, 1956  (tracks 1, 5–7 & 11), and  May 11, 1956 (tracks 3, 10 & 12)

Personnel 
Ray Bryant – piano
Wyatt Ruther – bass
Kenny Clarke (tracks 2, 4, 8 & 9),  Osie Johnson (tracks 3, 10 & 12), Jo Jones (tracks 1, 5–7 & 11) – drums
Candido – percussion (tracks 1 & 7)

References 

1956 albums
Ray Bryant albums
Epic Records albums